Alliance University (formerly Nyack College) is a private Christian college affiliated with the Christian and Missionary Alliance and located in New York, New York. Enrolling just over 1,000 students, the school is organized in three academic divisions, including the Alliance Theological Seminary, the College of Arts and Sciences, and the College of Graduate and Professional Programs. The university is accredited by the Middle States Commission on Higher Education but the accreditor placed the university on "show cause" status in mid-March of 2023, giving it one month to convince the accreditor to not revoke its accreditation.

History

Originally known as the Missionary Training Institute, the school was founded in 1882 in New York City by Dr. A.B. Simpson. Simpson resigned from a prestigious New York City pastorate to develop an interdenominational fellowship devoted to serving unreached people. Simpson's view was shared by many of his contemporaries, including mainline church leaders, laborers, and theological scholars.

The Missionary Training Institute was later granted a charter by the New York Board of Regents and the school's curriculum was registered by the State Education Department in 1944. In 1953, the school was authorized to confer the Bachelor of Science degree and, in 1961, the Bachelor of Arts degree. In 1960, the corporation was authorized to conduct a post-baccalaureate program as the forerunner of the Alliance Theological Seminary. Nyack first received school accreditation in 1962 from the Middle States Association of Colleges and Schools. In 1963, the school became a member of the American Council on Education.

After more than a decade of nomadic address changes for the Institute—including Eighth Avenue and 44th Street in Manhattan (now John's Pizzeria)—28 acres of land were purchased in Rockland County, New York, and, in 1897, the school relocated to the village of South Nyack becoming widely known as a Bible college and an institute for ministry preparation.

The seminary was established in 1960 as the Jaffray School of Missions, a graduate program of the college. The Jaffray School of Missions emphasized the interdisciplinary encounter between theology and the social sciences. In 1974, the Jaffray program was redesigned to include the preparation of students for ministry in North America and abroad. The name of the seminary was subsequently changed to the Alliance School of Theology and Missions. In September 1979, the Alliance School of Theology and Missions became Alliance Theological Seminary, which is recognized by the Christian and Missionary Alliance as the denomination's official seminary in the United States.

The school changed its name to Nyack College in 1972 and began offering professional degree programs like education and business in the early 1970s.

In 1997 the school returned to Manhattan with a branch campus. Steady growth in enrollment at the leased space in Lower Manhattan at 361 Broadway prompted a search in 2008 for a new permanent home for the New York City campus, an initiative that became known as The Miracle in Manhattan. Classes began in the new facility in fall 2013.

On November 7, 2018, the college announced plans to close its Nyack campus and consolidate its New York operations in its Manhattan-based campus by fall 2019. The Nyack campus was scheduled to close at the end of the 2018–2019 academic year, however delays in housing have pushed that out to September 2020.

The college consolidated its Nyack location with the Manhattan campus in September 2020. As part of its restructuring, the college was renamed to Alliance University, removing the Nyack name after the sale of the former Nyack campus.

Administration and organization
The college is led by an executive team with the top three officers — President, Provost, and Executive Vice President — who collectively have 84 years of service with the institution.

The Chronicle of Higher Education has named Nyack College a “Great College to Work For” for five consecutive years. The college has also received high marks in the areas of work/life balance, respect and appreciation, compensation and benefits, and diversity. In addition, U.S. News & World Report designated the college "Best Ethnic Diversity for North Regional Universities."

In 2021, Rajan S. Matthews was named President of Nyack College.

Academics
Alliance University offers undergraduate, graduate, and seminary programs and is divided into seven individual schools: 
The School of Business and Leadership
The School of Education
The School of Human Services
The School of Music
The College of Arts and Sciences
The College of Bible and Christian Ministry
Alliance Theological Seminary
Undergraduate degrees in 41 majors include Associate in Arts, Associate in Science, Bachelor of Arts, Bachelor of Science, Bachelor of Music, and Bachelor of Sacred Music. Graduate degrees include Master of Business Administration, Master of Arts, Master of Science, Master of Divinity, Master of Professional Studies, and Doctor of Ministry.

In spring 2013, Alliance University graduated its first baccalaureates awarded with a degree in nursing. The nursing program includes traditional four-year coursework and prepares students to work in hospitals around the world.

Alliance University, through a collaboration with Hudson Link for Higher Education in Prison, provides a Bachelor of Science degree in organizational management to incarcerated individuals at Fishkill Correctional Facility in Beacon, New York and at Sing Sing Correctional Facility in Ossining, New York.

Accreditations
Alliance University is accredited by the Middle States Commission on Higher Education. However, in March of 2023 the accreditor placed the university on "show cause" status for many alleged problems including a lack of financial resources. The university has one month to convince the accreditor to not revoke its accreditation.

Alliance University's teacher education programs are registered and approved by the State of New York. Alliance University is accredited by the National Council for Accreditation of Teacher Education (NCATE) and has programs in Childhood Education recognized by the Association for Childhood Education International (ACEI), Childhood Special Education by the Council for Exceptional Children (CEC), Early Childhood Education by the National Association for the Education of Young Children (NAEYC), English Education by the National Council for Teachers of English (NCTE), the Teaching English to Speakers of Other Languages (TESOL) organization, the Council for the Accreditation of Educator Preparation (CAEP), and Math Education by the National Council of Teachers of Mathematics (NCTM). It is a member of and accredited by the Association of Christian Schools International (ACSI) for teacher certification. The university's Rockland campus is also an accredited institutional member of the National Association of Schools of Music. Its nursing program is accredited by the Commission on Collegiate Nursing Education (CCNE) and by the New York State Board of Regents which is recognized nationally by the US Department of Education. The university's social work program is accredited by the Council on Social Work Education (CSWE).

Alliance Theological Seminary (ATS) is accredited by the Association of Theological Schools in the United States and Canada and, as a division of the university, by the Middle States Commission on Higher Education. ATS operates as a graduate school of the university under a charter granted by the Board of Regents of the State Education Department of the University of the State of New York. The Board of Regents for the State of New York empowers Alliance University to grant the Doctor of Ministry (D.Min.), Master of Divinity (M.Div.), Master of Professional Studies (M.P.S.), and Master of Arts (M.A.) degrees.

The Alliance Graduate School of Counseling is accredited by the Commission on Accreditation of Marriage and Family Therapy Education (COAMFTE).

Membership in the American Theological Library Association (ATLA), the New York Area Theological Library Association (NYATLA), and Westchester Academic Library Directors Organization (WALDO) provides cooperative access to interlibrary services and resources to the university's academic community.

The university is also chartered by the Board of Regents of the University of the State of New York. Its curricula are registered with the New York State Education Department and approved for the training of veterans under Public Laws 550 and 894.

New York State Correctional Service College Program
In partnership with Hudson Link for Higher Education in Prison, Nyack College offers college degree completion programs to prisoners at Sing Sing Correctional Facility. In 2015, the school graduated 24 inmates. To date, the program has a recidivism rate of less than 2% (as compared to the national average of 43%).

Library
The Alliance Theological Seminary Library, Bailey Library (in Nyack, New York) and the Robert Eastman Library (in Manhattan) support the academic research needs of Nyack's undergraduate, graduate, and seminary students and faculty.

Nyack College's library has been located in three separate buildings on campus during the history of the college: Simpson Hall, Shuman Hall, and (since 1994) its present location.

Reputation and rankings
 U.S. News & World Report ranked Nyack College as one of the 10 most diverse colleges in the northern region of the United States. The report focuses on total student body from the 2015–2016 school year and excludes international students.
 The Chronicle of Higher Education has named Nyack College a "Great College to Work For" for the fifth consecutive year as of 2015. The college received high marks in the areas of work/life balance, respect and appreciation, compensation and benefits, and diversity.
 The inaugural Wall Street Journal/Times Higher Education College Rankings named Nyack College among the top 20 schools in the nation assessed for campus environment. According to the October 28, 2016 article, the campus environment category evaluates "the racial and ethnic diversity of students and faculty, the number of international students enrolled and the inclusion of students from lower-income and first-generation college families." In addition, Nyack was recognized for being among "the top multicultural schools in the Northeast" region of the United States.

Campuses

New York City 
Opened in August 2013, the New York City campus is located at 2 Washington Street near Battery Park. This campus includes a library, classrooms, and laboratories, a rehearsal studio and group counseling observation space.

In 2020 the institution consolidated, and student housing is located in Jersey City, New Jersey at 150 Bay St. Each room houses up to six students.

Rockland County 
The residential campus in Rockland County, New York, was a  plot of land with views of the Hudson Valley. The northern part of the campus, and the public school behind it, were formerly part of the old Clarkstown Country Club.

On November 7, 2018, the college announced plans to sell both Rockland County properties and shift all programs to its Manhattan-based campus by fall of 2019. The closing of the Rockland campus was delayed until January 2020 due to incomplete student housing.

Puerto Rico 
Seminario Teológico de Puerto Rico is the Alliance Theological Seminary extension in San Juan, Puerto Rico.

Student life
Alliance University's student body consists of 1,028 undergraduates and 401 graduate and professional students (as of fall 2019).

Jersey City Dorms

Each floor features a laundry room which is open around the clock and seven days a week. Other amenities include a state-of-the-art fitness center, an athletic training room and onsite dining in “The Eatery.”

Manhattan Campus

Student organizations
The Office of Student Development hosts activities and events throughout the school year, including field trips, luncheons, and games. Chapel services are also held twice week on Tuesday and Thursday.

Athletics
Formerly the Purple Pride, and before that, the Fighting Parsons, Alliance University athletes are now known as Warriors. The Warriors participate in the Central Atlantic Collegiate Conference of the NCAA's Division II. In 2011, the men's soccer team earned their first bid to the Division II NCAA tournament.

List of sports
Alliance University has several athletic teams competing through the academic year.

Fall
Women's volleyball 
Women's cross-country 
Women's soccer
Men's soccer 
Men's cross-country

Winter
Women's basketball 
Men's basketball

Spring
Women's softball
Women's lacrosse 
Women's track and field
Men's baseball 
Men's track and field

Conference affiliations
Member, National Collegiate Athletic Association (NCAA)
Member, Central Atlantic Collegiate Conference (CACC)

Notable alumni 
 Kurtis Blow, rapper 
Cynthia Davis, politician
Mark Putnam, American college president
Donald J. Harlin, United States air force general
Karl Hood, Grenadian politician
James Knaggs, American Salvation Army officer
Seth Galloway, American soccer player
Maryanne J. George, American Christian musician
 Rashida Jolley, harpist
Josh Tillman, also known as Father John Misty, musician. (Did not graduate.)

References

External links

 
Educational institutions established in 1882
Seminaries and theological colleges in New York (state)
Private universities and colleges in New York (state)
Universities and colleges affiliated with the Christian and Missionary Alliance
Evangelicalism in New York (state)
Council for Christian Colleges and Universities
1882 establishments in New York (state)
Liberal arts colleges in New York (state)